Russell Landau is an American composer of film and television scores and themes including seaQuest 2032, Survivor, Fear Factor, and Pirate Master for which he won an Emmy in 2008. He is an alumnus of the University of Bridgeport class of 1977 (South End, Bridgeport, Connecticut).

He also created the music for the 2004 ABC pilot of Deal or No Deal.

References

American male composers
21st-century American composers
Landau, Russ
Landau, Russ
Living people
Place of birth missing (living people)
University of Bridgeport alumni
21st-century American male musicians
Paul Winter Consort members